Le Strade dei vini e dei sapori (Roads of Wines and Tastes) is the name for the collection of routes in and around Italy, that lead to and through major regional food and wine production areas.

These routes, all in Emilia Romagna, are:
in the Province of Piacenza:
 Strada dei vini e dei sapori dei Colli Piacentini
in the Province of Parma:
 Strada del Culatello di Zibello
 Strada del Prosciutto e dei vini dei Colli di Parma
 Strada del Fungo Porcino di Borgotaro
in the Province of Reggio Emilia:
 Strada dei vini e dei sapori delle Corti Reggiane
 Strada dei vini e dei sapori Colline di Scandiano e Canossa
in the Province of Modena:
 Strada dei vini e dei sapori della Pianura Modenese
 Strada dei vini e dei sapori Città Castelli Ciliegi
in the Metropolitan City of Bologna:
 Strada dei vini e dei sapori dei Colli d'Imola
in the Province of Ferrara:
 Strada dei vini e dei sapori Provincia di Ferrara
in the Province of Ravenna:
 Strada del Sangiovese dei sapori delle Colline di Faenza
in the Province of Forlì-Cesena:
 Strada dei vini e dei sapori dei Colli di Forlì e Cesena
in the Province of Rimini:
 Strada dei vini e dei sapori dei Colli di Rimini

See also
Wine route

References

External links
Official website
 Le Strade del Vino e dei Sapori in Italia

Tourism in Italy
Italian wine
Italian cuisine